Héctor Manuel González Ortíz (born 5 April 1972) is an Ecuadorian football manager and former player who played as a midfielder.

International career
González was a member of the Ecuador national football team at the 1997 Copa América. He obtained just one international cap during his career, on 28 May 1997, in a friendly against El Salvador.

External links

1972 births
Living people
Sportspeople from Esmeraldas, Ecuador
Association football midfielders
Ecuadorian footballers
Ecuador international footballers
1997 Copa América players
L.D.U. Quito footballers
C.D. Olmedo footballers
Ecuadorian football managers
C.D. Olmedo managers